Saint Ignatius of Loyola and Stanislaus Kostka church in Kremenets is a church in Kremenets, Ukraine. 

Formerly a Jesuit Roman Catholic church, designed by Paweł Giżycki and build around 1731–1745, it was converted into a parish church following the disbandment of Jesuits in the late 18th century, then into an orthodox church in mid-19th century, briefly restored to Catholics during the Second Polish Republic time, converted into a sports center during the Soviet Union time and following the fall of the Soviet Union, turned over to the Ukrainian Orthodox Church of the Kyivan Patriarchate as Church of the Transfiguration.

See also
 List of Jesuit sites

Further reading

  Betlej Andrzej, Kościół Jezuitów w Krzemieńcu. Uwagi na temat autorstwa i genezy architektury oraz relacji architekt-fundator, [in:] "Studia nad sztuką renesansu i baroku", t. 5, red. J. Lileyko, Lublin 2000, s. 193–216.
   Muszyńska-Krasnowolska M., Kolegium pojezuickie w Krzemieñcu, [in:] Rocznik Wołyñski, 1939, t. 8, s. 67–139.

Kremenets
Churches in Ukraine
Churches of the Orthodox Church of Ukraine
18th-century churches in Ukraine